Kevin Weekes (born April 4, 1975) is a Canadian former professional ice hockey goaltender who played 348 games in the National Hockey League (NHL). He is now a studio analyst for NHL Networks' On the Fly, NHL Tonight, and ESPN's The Point, while also working for ESPN/ABC.

Playing career

As a youth, Weekes played in the 1989 Quebec International Pee-Wee Hockey Tournament with the Toronto Red Wings minor ice hockey team.

Weekes' career began with the Owen Sound Platers of the Ontario Hockey League. He also had a brief stint with the Ottawa 67's.

He was chosen 41st overall by the Florida Panthers in the 1993 NHL Entry Draft. In 1996, while playing for the Panthers' American Hockey League (AHL) affiliate, the Carolina Monarchs, Weekes was loaned to the Rochester Americans to participate in the 1996 Spengler Cup competition and was named MVP of the tournament. He made his NHL debut with the Panthers on October 16, 1997, going 0–5–1 in 11 appearances for the Panthers. The following summer he was traded to the Vancouver Canucks in a trade for Pavel Bure and compiled a 6–15–5 record in 31 appearances over a season and a half before being traded to the New York Islanders halfway through the 1999–2000 season. At the conclusion of that season he was traded to the Tampa Bay Lightning, where he played until late in the 2001–02 season.

The Carolina Hurricanes acquired Weekes on March 5, 2002 for Chris Dingman and Shane Willis. Weekes essentially served as a backup to Arturs Irbe during the remainder of the regular season, only playing in two of the final seventeen games for the Hurricanes. During the playoffs, Weekes played an important part in the Hurricanes run to the 2002 Stanley Cup Finals. Weekes played in eight games during the 2002 playoffs, including relieving Irbe in a first round, game four loss against the New Jersey Devils, and starting in goal during the critical games five and six of that series., which the Hurricanes won four games to two. Weekes also started games one, two and three of the second round against the Montreal Canadiens before being replaced by Irbe. During the playoffs, Weekes recorded back to back shutouts, with a 32 save shutout in game six of the first round against the New Jersey Devils and a 25 save shutout in game one of the second round against the Montreal Canadiens.

Weekes was the primary goaltender for the Hurricanes during the 2002–03 season playing in 51 games and compiling a 14–24–9 record and was the primary goaltender for the Hurricanes in 2003-04 playing in 66 games compiling a 23–30–11 record.

Weekes signed with the New York Rangers as a free agent prior to the 2004–05 NHL lock-out, winning his first start with the Rangers on October 5, 2005, in a game against the Philadelphia Flyers. His time with the Rangers looked to be promising until an injury kept him out and he lost his number one spot to Henrik Lundqvist. Lundqvist came in to play in place of Weekes and played exceptionally well. Weekes remained in good spirits upon his healthy return to the team even though he had been bumped to the number two spot and back up to the rookie Lundqvist. He became an unrestricted free agent following a less-than-stellar 2006–07 season.

On July 5, 2007, he signed with the New Jersey Devils to serve as a backup to All-Star Martin Brodeur. In the 2008–09 season, Brodeur suffered an injury which sidelined him for almost the entire season. This left Weekes and Scott Clemmensen battling for the number one spot. Brodeur returned, Weekes remained as the backup and Clemmensen was sent back down to the AHL. Weekes was injured in a game on 3 April 2009. Clemmensen took over as the backup to Brodeur. The Devils made the playoffs but lost to the Carolina Hurricanes in Game 7 of the Eastern Conference quarter finals.

Weekes announced his retirement from playing on September 27, 2009.

Broadcasting career
Weekes made history in 2009, when he became the first black analyst in ice hockey. Weekes provides colour commentary for NHL games on the NHL Network and Hockey Night in Canada. In The Hockey News 2011 edition of the 100 Most Powerful people in ice hockey, Weekes was considered one of the Top 40 under the age of 40.

In 2021, Weekes made his debut as an analyst for the NHL on ESPN. He appeared during ESPN coverage of the 2021 NHL Expansion Draft and the 2021 NHL Draft.

Personal life
Weekes was born in Toronto, Ontario. His parents emigrated from Barbados to Canada and went to Dr. Norman Bethune Collegiate Institute.

The reason that Weekes sometimes wore jersey number 80 was he wanted to wear 00. However, the NHL does not allow a player to wear single or double zero jerseys. Weekes chose the number that most closely resembled 00. Upon signing with the New Jersey Devils, as a result of former general manager Lou Lamoriello's policy of wearing jerseys 1–40 with exception of marquee players, Weekes was given jersey number 1. Weekes wore 00 in junior hockey when he played for the Ottawa 67's.

Weekes and Willie O'Ree appeared in the Everybody Hates Chris episode "Everybody Hates Gretzky" in 2008.

In February 2023, Weekes became an American citizen.

Career statistics

See also
 List of black NHL players
 List of NHL seasons
 NHL goaltenders

References

External links
 

1975 births
Living people
Black Canadian broadcasters
Black Canadian ice hockey players
Canadian colour commentators
Canadian ice hockey goaltenders
Canadian people of Barbadian descent
Canadian television sportscasters
Carolina Hurricanes players
Carolina Monarchs players
Detroit Vipers players
Florida Panthers draft picks
Florida Panthers players
Fort Wayne Komets players
National Hockey League broadcasters
New Jersey Devils players
New York Islanders players
New York Rangers players
Ottawa 67's players
Owen Sound Platers players
Ice hockey people from Toronto
Tampa Bay Lightning players
Vancouver Canucks players
Canadian expatriate ice hockey players in the United States